Three Oaks is a census-designated place (CDP) in Lee County, Florida, United States. The population was 3,592 at the 2010 census, up from 2,255 at the 2000 census. It is part of the Cape Coral-Fort Myers, Florida Metropolitan Statistical Area.

Geography
Three Oaks is located in south-central Lee County at  (26.467908, -81.795768). It is bordered to the south by the village of Estero and to the west by the San Carlos Park census-designated place. Interstate 75 forms the eastern border of the Three Oaks CDP, with access from Exit 128 (Alico Road) at the northeast corner of the CDP. I-75 leads north  to the eastern side of Fort Myers and south  to the Naples area.

Demographics

As of the census of 2000, there were 2,255 people, 749 households, and 650 families residing in the CDP. The racial makeup of the CDP was 96.10% White, 0.27% African American, 0.18% Native American, 1.37% Asian, 1.37% from other races, and 0.71% from two or more races. Hispanic or Latino of any race were 4.26% of the population.

There were 749 households, out of which 52.1% had children under the age of 18 living with them, 77.0% were married couples living together, 7.9% had a female householder with no husband present, and 13.2% were non-families. 10.4% of all households were made up of individuals, and 3.7% had someone living alone who was 65 years of age or older.  The average household size was 3.01 and the average family size was 3.23.

In the CDP, the population was spread out, with 33.6% under the age of 18, 3.6% from 18 to 24, 32.1% from 25 to 44, 22.1% from 45 to 64, and 8.7% who were 65 years of age or older.  The median age was 36 years. For every 100 females, there were 96.8 males.  For every 100 females age 18 and over, there were 93.0 males.

The median income for a household in the CDP was $69,911, and the median income for a family was $74,286. Males had a median income of $50,250 versus $30,217 for females. The per capita income for the CDP was $23,997.  About 1.0% of families and 1.6% of the population were below the poverty line, including 2.5% of those under age 18 and none of those age 65 or over.

References

Census-designated places in Lee County, Florida
Census-designated places in Florida